Senator Hopper may refer to:

John Hopper (politician) (1923–1996), Pennsylvania State Senate
Randy Hopper (born 1966), Wisconsin State Senate

See also
Senator Hooper (disambiguation)